Four Eagles is a series of four columns, each topped with sculptures of eagles, installed in Brooklyn's Grand Army Plaza, in the U.S. state of New York. The granite and bronze columns, designed by sculptor Frederick William MacMonnies and architect Stanford White, were cast and dedicated in 1901.

References

External links

 

1901 establishments in New York City
1901 sculptures
Bronze sculptures in Brooklyn
Grand Army Plaza
Granite sculptures in New York City
Outdoor sculptures in Brooklyn
Sculptures of birds in the United States
Statues in New York City